Žeželj is a South Slavic surname.

People 
Danijel Žeželj (born 1966), Croatian comic book artist
Dražen Žeželj (born 1976), Slovenian footballer
Petar Žeželj (1965–2009), Canadian ice hockey player

Croatian surnames
Serbian surnames
Slovene-language surnames